Jim Murray (30 May 1942 – 1 March 2013) was a guitarist and harmonica player for the psychedelic blues rock band Quicksilver Messenger Service. He also handled lead and background vocals on some songs. He left the band in late 1967 shortly before they recorded their first album.

The outtakes from the movie Monterey Pop have rare footage of Quicksilver from their early days as a quintet, performing "Dino's Song" on which Murray played rhythm guitar. After Murray left, the group remained a quartet until the lead vocalist slot was filled by Dino Valenti.

In 1970 Murray was briefly in John Cipollina's post-Quicksilver band Copperhead, and after leaving Copperhead he sometimes sat in with them live.

References

Jim Murray sang "Dino's Song" and played guitar. Gary Duncan sang but did not play guitar on that song as it was slung behind his back during the performance of the song. John Cippolina played guitar while David Freiberg accompanied Murray on vocals and played bass. Duncan played a tambourine during the last chorus. (At the Monterey Pop Festival performance)

1942 births
2013 deaths
American rock guitarists
American male guitarists
American harmonica players
Quicksilver Messenger Service members
20th-century American guitarists
20th-century American male musicians